Alpina Burkard Bovensiepen GmbH & Co. KG is an automobile manufacturing company based in Buchloe, in the Ostallgäu district of Bavaria, Germany that develops and sells high-performance versions of BMW cars.

Alpina works closely with BMW and their processes are integrated into BMW's production lines, thus Alpina is recognized by the German Ministry of Transport as an automobile manufacturer, in contrast to other performance specialists, which are aftermarket tuners. For instance, the Alpina B7 is produced at the same assembly line in Dingolfing, Germany (BMW Plant Dingolfing), as BMW's own 7 Series. The B7's twin-turbo 4.4-litre V8 is assembled by hand at Alpina's facility in Buchloe, Germany, before being shipped to BMW for installation, and the assembled vehicle is then sent back to Alpina for finishing touches.

The firm was founded in 1965 by Burkard Bovensiepen, a member of the Bovensiepen family of industrialists.

On March 10, 2022, BMW announced its intention to acquire Alpina. That same day, BMW wrote on its website that it had officially acquired the brand.

History

Alpina's roots can be traced back to 1962, when Burkard Bovensiepen developed a Weber dual carburetor for the BMW 1500. This carburetor was well received by the automotive press, as well as BMW's own sales boss Paul G. Hahnemann. In 1964, BMW certified the quality of this Alpina product by awarding BMW vehicles fitted with the Alpina system the full factory guarantee.

Alpina Burkard Bovensiepen KG was established on 1 January 1965 in Kaufbeuren, Bavaria. The company had eight employees.

Although Alpina started by producing typewriters, the original Alpina ceased to exist at the end of the 1960s in their attempt to move into the textile industry. In 1965, Burkard established a BMW tuning business, following his success with investments in the stock market. He started the tuning business in an outbuilding of the original Alpina typewriter factory. The company worked on carburetors and revised cylinder heads. By 1970, with seventy employees, the original facility changed locations from Kaufbeuren to Buchloe.

In its first years, Alpina established its core competency by tuning carburetors and crankshafts to extract more power from BMW engines, elements that eventually defined the company's logo, which came into being in 1967.

Between 1968 and 1977, Alpina cars did very well in competition. The highlight was in 1970, when the team's cars won the European Touring Car Championship, the German Hillclimb Championship, rally and track racing championships, and the prestigious Spa 24 Hours.

Alpina officially withdrew from racing in 1988 because of capacity limitations and restrictions. Tied to this was the decision to begin production of a new set of BMW Alpina automobiles.

Brand distinctions
Since 1983, Alpina has been recognized by the German Federal Ministry of Transport as an automobile manufacturer, thus Alpina-built cars are branded and registered as Alpina instead of BMW, although an Alpina can be serviced at all BMW dealerships, and is fully covered if a warranty issue arises. Alpina automobiles are also sold at some BMW dealerships.

Distinctive features of Alpina vehicles are the fact that these models are literally "manu-factured", meaning "hand-made". The production process switches between fine tuning the engine, delivering it to the BMW plant, marrying engine and body there, and bringing it back to Alpina for interior upgrade with Alpina's specific components, again all in a hand-made process that allows only limited production numbers. Besides engine and interior, Alpina also optimizes the transmission and installs steering wheel-mounted button shifters (called Switch-Tronic) on most cars, with paddle shifters used on the B4 S Edition 99. This has historic reasons, since Alpina was the first to mount shifting buttons on the steering wheel.
Distinguishing marks from the exterior are the 20-spoke alloy wheels with hidden valves under the center cap and the "Alpina Blue" or "Alpina Green" metallic exterior colours. Inside, "the finest materials are used to fabricate the exclusive feel". A typical blue and green pattern is often used on interior parts such as stitching on leather. A thin, pinstriped style outside body decor set in gold or silver is also a hallmark of older Alpina cars which is an option on new Alpina models. Another distinguishing mark is the Alpina wordmark at the bottom of the car's front, a design heralded from its racing cars. A metal plate inside also proves the heritage and the serial number of the car.

Compared to cars from BMW's in-house performance subsidiary, BMW M, Alpina's vehicles have more emphasis on Touring, higher torque, and have their own Alpina-style shiftable ZF automatic transmissions instead of manual or semi-automatic transmissions. For instance, regarding the high performance variants of the BMW E60 5 Series, the B5 offers a different take on performance and how to accomplish it. Unlike BMW M's own M5 which has a naturally aspirated, high-revving 5.0L V10, the Alpina B5 uses a supercharged 4.4L V8 which produces similar horsepower and greater torque at lower rpm.

Current lineup

Alpina D3 Bi-Turbo Saloon/Touring: based on the BMW F30/F31 3 Series - featuring a 3.0-litre straight-six bi-turbocharged diesel engine, delivering  / 
Alpina B3 S Bi-Turbo Saloon/Touring: based on the BMW F30/F31 3 Series - featuring a 3.0-litre straight-six bi-turbocharged petrol engine, delivering  / 
Alpina XD3: based on the BMW G01 X3 - featuring a 3.0-litre straight-six diesel engine:
a quad-turbocharged version delivering  /  (left-hand drive)
a bi-turbocharged version delivering  /  (right-hand drive)
Alpina D4 Bi-Turbo Coupé/Convertible: based on the BMW F32/F33 4 Series - featuring a 3.0-litre straight-six bi-turbo diesel engine, delivering  / 
Alpina B4 S Bi-Turbo Coupé/Convertible: based on the BMW F32/F33 4 Series - featuring a 3.0-litre straight-six bi-turbocharged engine, delivering  / 
Alpina B4 S Bi-Turbo Edition 99 Coupé/Convertible: based on the BMW F32/F33 4 Series - featuring a 3.0-litre straight-six bi-turbocharged engine, delivering  / 
Alpina XD4: based on the BMW G02 X4 - featuring a 3.0-litre quad-turbocharged straight-six diesel engine delivering   (right-hand drive only)
Alpina D5 S Saloon/Touring: based on the BMW G30/G31 5 Series - featuring a 3.0-litre straight-six bi-turbocharged diesel engine :
delivering  /  (left-hand drive)
delivering  /  (right-hand drive)
Alpina B5 Saloon/Touring: based on the BMW G30/G31 5 Series - featuring a 4.4-litre V8 bi-turbocharged engine.  / 
Alpina B6 Bi-Turbo Coupé/Convertible/Gran Coupé: based on the BMW F06/F12/F13 6 Series - featuring a 4.4 L V8 bi-turbo engine.  /  
Alpina B7 Bi-Turbo: based on the BMW G12 7 Series - featuring a 4.4 L V8 bi-turbo engine.  / 
Alpina B8 Gran Coupe: based on the BMW G16 8 Series - featuring a 4.4 L V8 bi-turbo engine. 630 PS (457 kW; 620 hp) /  
Alpina XB7: based on the BMW G07 X7 - featuring a 4.4 L V8 bi-turbo engine. 621 PS (457 kW; 612 hp) /

Alpina XD3

The Alpina XD3 made its debut at the 2018 Geneva Motor Show. The XD3 is fitted with an Alpina-modified version of BMW's B57 diesel inline-six engine.

Alpina XD4
The Alpina XD4 debuted at the 2018 Geneva Motor Show. It is available in left-hand drive markets only.

Alpina B3 Bi-Turbo

The F30 Alpina B3 Bi-Turbo was in production since March 2013. It is based on the BMW F30 335i with a bi-turbocharged 3.0 litre six cylinder. The B3 Biturbo is available as a sedan or touring, both can be combined with xDrive four-wheel drive.

Alpina modified the exterior with front and rear spoilers and a quad-exit exhaust system.

In March 2017, Alpina revised the engine of the B3, It now produces .

Alpina D3 Bi-Turbo

The Alpina D3 Bi-Turbo was presented at IAA 2013. It is based on the BMW F30. The Touring is also available with all-wheel drive, based on BMW xDrive.

Alpina B4 Bi-Turbo

Launched in 2014, the B4 is based on the 435i. The N55 straight-six engine is modified by using twin-turbochargers, a sixty-one percent larger intercooler and a new crankshaft.

Alpina B5 Bi-Turbo

The Alpina B5 was introduced at the 2017 Geneva Motor Show in all-wheel drive Saloon or Touring versions. Based on the N63B44O2 V8, it has uprated pistons, new twin-scroll Garrett turbochargers and new spark plugs by NGK.

Alpina D5 S 

The Alpina D5 S debuted at the 2017 Frankfurt Motor Show in all-wheel drive only sedan and Touring variants. The D5 S uses a modified 3.0-liter B57D30 diesel inline-six engine. Alpina claims it is the fastest diesel-powered production car in the world.

Alpina B6 Gran Coupé 

The high performance Alpina B6 Gran Coupé xDrive was launched in 2014. This model is conceived by Alpina and based on the 650i. This model is sold by BMW only in the United States and in Canada (but Alpina also independently offers it in other countries). Specification includes a more luxurious interior, 20-inch Alpina light-alloy wheels, aerodynamic elements and exclusive Alpina trims and paints. (324 km/h or 202 mph for the 2016-2019 model)

Alpina B7

The Alpina B7 is one of the two Alpina cars offered in the US and Canada, the other one being the Alpina B6. The B7 is produced at the same assembly line in Dingolfing, Germany, along with BMW's own 7 Series. It can be equipped identically to a normal M760li. However, an exclusive Alpina Green finish is available.

BMW permitted Alpina to produce a high-performance version of its flagship 7 Series, however they did not want it to be a high-revving, BMW M version (which would have been known as a "BMW M7" under the current nomenclature). It has also been suggested that there was no market for an M7 that would have featured the BMW M's trademark high-rev engine and twin-clutch automated manual transmission, and most customers who desired a performance option in the 7 Series would have gone for the V12-engined BMW 760Li.

Competitors include the Mercedes-Benz S63 AMG and Audi S8.

Alpina B7 xDrive

The Alpina B7 xDrive was announced by BMW North America on 8 February 2016 with sales starting in September 2016.

The Alpina B7 features a  4.4 litre twin-turbocharged V8 engine delivering  of torque and a more luxurious interior. It was unveiled at the 2016 Geneva Motor Show.

The face-lifted model, unveiled in February 2019, has a better power band which allows better performance, with a 0– acceleration time of 3.6 seconds.

Previous models

Petrol-engine

Diesel-engine

3 Series based Alpinas

Alpina C1

The Alpina C1 was based on the E21 323i and was among their most popular early models, providing superior performance over the unmodified car. The extra power is due to special Mahle pistons, and a special exhaust and ignition system. It also received dry-sump lubrication and a short-ratio five-speed gearbox. Only 35 C1 cars were built, making it one of the rarest Alpina models. The brakes and suspension were also upgraded.

The C1 2.5 and early C2 / 2.6* models used the M20B23 (2,3L) engine, but bore and stroke were increased to achieve a displacement of 2552 cm3. Alpina reworked the head which was ported and polished, installed harder valve springs and a hotter cam. The intake manifold was also reworked, and Alpina used a larger throttle body. Alpina claimed 0– acceleration in 7.1 seconds. Production is unclear, with estimates ranging from 35 cars built to around 400 depending on the source.

Alpina C2

An interesting variant of the M20 engine was Alpina's C2. The first C2 combined the wider bore of the M20B25 with the slightly larger  crankshaft of an M20B23, to create a torquier engine of 2552 cc. After the C2 2.7 appeared in the spring of 1986, the 2.5 was slightly upgraded and gained 5 horsepower. However, to indicate its "little brother" position in the lineup, the name was changed to C1 2.5. When the September 1987 facelift model of the E30 was introduced, the 2.5 litre C1 was discontinued, although a few cars were finished into 1988.

The larger yet 2.7 litre unit was introduced in February 1986 in uncatalyzed C2/1 form. This engine, sharing the dimensions of the M20B27, develops  at 5800 rpm and shows what the engine was really capable of. Originally installed in the E30-based Alpina C2 2.7, with available four-wheel drive, the catalyzed C2/2 appeared in the interim C2 2.7 Kat in March 1987. This was then renamed "B3 2.7" five months later, by which time the "C2" labelled cars were discontinued. The B3 2.7 continued to be available until June 1992, in all body variants and drivetrain configurations (excepting automatics) in which the E30 was offered. Around 1986, 67 "B6 2.7"-labelled C2-engined E30s were built for export to Japan, where the larger 3.0 L B6 3.5 had a hard time passing emissions regulations. Aside from the C2 drivetrain, the B6 2.7 is cosmetically identical to the B6 3.5.

Later C2 2.5 models (C2 /3 2.5) were based on the 325i. Alpina used the M20B25 engine with very few modifications compared to earlier models. Again the cylinder head was decked to increase compression ratio, and it was ported and polished. The ECU was also remapped. Only 50 cars were built.

The C2 /1 2.7 used the 325e eta model engine block, crank and rods, but with custom flat head pistons provided by Mahle. Originally Alpina modified the "200" casting number cylinder head specific to the 325e with bigger intake valves, larger air intake ports, and redesigned the valve chamber for better flow. A more aggressive camshaft was used, with higher lift and duration, and harder valve springs were installed. Compression ratio was increased to 10.2:1.

Later C2 /2 2.7 (and early 1987 B3 2.7) used the M20B25 block with ETA (325e) crank and rods. The intake manifold was also redesigned for better flow. The head was decked to improve compression ratio (10.1:1 for models with the 731 head, 9.6:1 for later "885" head models with catalytic converter) and matched with custom pistons - flat Mahle pistons for engines equipped with the 731 head, and domed KS pistons for engines equipped with the 885 head. Larger throttle bodies were installed (the C2/2 version uses the same throttle body as the M20B25 325i). A total of 309 cars were built between 1986 and 1987.

The B3 2.7 is similar to late C2/2 2.7 cars. It uses the M20B25 block with M20B27 crank and custom rods. The 885 head is exclusively used for the B3 model. The head is decked ~ 1 mm to improve CR to 9.6:1 and matched with custom domed KS or Mahle pistons. Intake and cylinder head are ported and polished. Custom ECU mapping is used. Engine management is Bosch Motronic 1.3. The B3 2.7 is equipped with a catalytic converter to conform to emission standard of the time. Performance numbers are similar to the later C2/2 2.7 cars. 254 cars were built from 1987 to 1992.

Alpina B6

The Alpina B6 2.8 is based on the 323i, but uses the same B6/2 engine used in the B6 E21.

The engine uses custom Mahle pistons and rods. The cylinder head was ported and polished, and a hotter cam was used. Suspension and brakes were upgraded. Bigger ventilated disks and progressive springs were installed at the front. Only 210 cars were made from 1986 to 1990. The B6 3.5 was sold in Japan as the B6 2.7 and used the 2.7 L engine from the Alpina C2 as the larger 3.0 L engine was unable to pass emissions.

The Alpina B6 3.5 S uses the M3 chassis. Displacement is 3430 cm3. 0– is achieved in 6.4 seconds. The gearbox used is the Getrag 260/6 sport, known as a dog-leg gearbox. Only 62 cars were made from 1987 to 1990.

Alpina B3 GT3

To celebrate Alpina's victory in the 2011 ADAC GT Masters with an Alpina B6 GT3, Alpina decided to produce a limited run of the Alpina B3 S Bi-Turbo, called the Alpina B3 GT3. It features upgraded brakes with 380 mm discs, a Drexler limited slip differential and fully adjustable coilovers at all four corners.

The most noticeable changes were on the exterior: The B3 GT3 sports a carbon fibre rear wing, a special front splitter and 19" lightweight Alpina GT3 Classic wheels, painted in Himalaya Grey. The B3 GT3 was available in Black Sapphire metallic, Mineral White metallic, Alpina Blue metallic or with a full body vinyl wrap in the official GT3 design. The car could be ordered with an extra set of lightweight wheels (also 19" Alpina GT3 Classic, but equipped with Michelin Pilot Sport Cup+ tires) for use on the track.

Only 99 units were produced.

5 Series based Alpinas

E12 B2 
The Alpina B2 is based on the 1976 BMW 5 Series (E12) 528i. The car featured a bored-out   3.0-liter straight-six fitted with three double barrel carburetors. Only eleven B2 were built before the introduction of the B7.

E12 B7 Turbo / B7 S Turbo 

The Alpina B7 Turbo is based on the BMW 5 Series (E12) 528i like its predecessor the B2. Only sixty B7 S Turbos were produced.

E28 B9

The Alpina B9 was built in a small series from November 1981 to December 1985 on the basis of the BMW E28. About 500 examples were produced.

Changes 
The B9 is based on the 528i, whose M30-2.8-litre BMW engine was replaced by a 3.45-litre. Alpina tuned engine. The motor is based on the 3.5-liter version of the M30, but has been extensively modified. Alpina replaced the cylinder head, pistons, camshaft and modified the 
Bosch Motronic ECU. The engine transmits its power to the rear wheels via a 5-speed gearbox, an automatic transmission was also available. The suspension of the E28 has been modified with Bilstein gas dampers, as standard the B9 was delivered with 16-inch wheels (see picture). Alpina also modified the interior with among other things, Recaro seats, a new shifter and a modified instrument cluster.

Technical specifications

E28 B10
In 1985, Alpina launched the B10 3.5, based on the BMW 535i (E28).

The 3.5 liter six-cylinder engine from the B6 3.5 was fitted to replace the B9's 3.45 liter. Only 77 examples of the B10 3.5 were produced.

Technical specifications

E34 B10

B10 3.5
The B10 3.5 was the first Alpina based on the BMW E34, With production beginning in April 1988 at launch it was the only available B10. In 1992 production was stopped after 572 cars were made.

B10 4.0
In 1993 the BMW M30 ended production forcing Alpina to discontinue the B10 3.5 and B10 BiTurbo. In April 1993 Alpina launched their replacement, the first B10 with an eight-cylinder engine. The BMW M60 engine of the BMW 540i was modified with higher-compression Mahle pistons and a modified air intake.

B10 3.0 Allrad
The B10 3.0 Allrad was based on the all-wheel drive BMW 525ix, launched in October 1993.

B10 4.6
The B10 4.6 replaced the B10 biturbo from March 1994 onwards. The engine was a re-designed and enlarged V8 with a displacement of 4.6 liters, which was also used in the E36 Alpina B8 4.6 With , the power was only just below the B10 Bi-Turbo. 27 saloon cars were produced, and 19 Tourings - all were left hand drive except one right hand drive Touring.

Technical specifications

E34 B10 BiTurbo

The B10 BiTurbo is a high performance version of the BMW 5 Series E34. Beginning production in 1989, the B10 BiTurbo was based on the 535i and received several upgrades by Alpina, being the fastest production saloon in the world at the time of its introduction, as tested by Road & Track. Production ended in 1994 with 507 examples produced, almost as many as the B10 3.5.

E39 B10 

The B10 was built as a sedan and touring based on the BMW E39 from January 1997 to May 2004.

In February 2000, Alpina introduced the Alpina D10 Biturbo, the first six-cylinder diesel model produced by Alpina. It was at the time the most powerful diesel saloon in the world. High-pressure common-rail injection technology (the famous Bosch CP3 high-pressure pump) has revolutionized the diesel industry.

Engines 
The third generation of the B10 was built with both six-cylinder and V8 engines.

The six-cylinder engines with 3.2 and 3.3 liters displacement were based on the 528i and the 530i. For the 3.3 liter engine the engine block was bored to increase displacement to 3298 cubic centimeters. The cylinder head was machined and a modified crankshaft was added, different pistons and camshafts were also used. A modified intake system enabled a higher rate of air flow, as well as a stainless steel exhaust system (Alpina-Bosal) with metal catalytic converters.

The two V8 engines with 4.6 (B10 V8) and 4.8 liters (B10 V8S) come from the BMW 540i.
and  through an increased stroke with the 4.8 liter engine.

Suspension 
The original suspension from the BMW E39 has been reworked for the B10. Changes include modified springs and tuned shock absorbers from Sachs that help lower the car.

Technical data

E60 B5 

The BMW E60 and the 4.4-liter BMW N62 engine from the 545i serve as the basis for the Alpina B5. Compared to the E60, the B5 has larger brakes, a new suspension with Electronic Damper Control, a stainless steel silencing system with polished double tailpipes and the typical Alpina changes to the interior and exterior.

The B5 was made from February 2005 to September 2007 and the B5 S was made from September 2007 to May 2010.

Drivetrain 
The N62B44's output is increased by means of a centrifugal supercharger. The supercharger is made by the company ASA, and is also called "Turbessor" because it is able to combine the advantages of turbocharger and supercharger. At low speeds, it spontaneously responds as a conventional displacement compressor, but it can also immediately provide the thrust of a turbo. It also reaches speeds of more than 100,000 revolutions per minute. The power is transmitted to the rear wheels by means of a six-speed automatic transmission (6HP26). As usual with Alpina, this was refined and has "Switch-Tronic".

Technical data

Note 
In 2005, an Alpina B5 Touring was tested by Auto, Motor und Sport on the Nardò Ring.

Alpina B5 S 
At the 2007 Frankfurt Motor Show (IIA), Alpina presented the revised B5 S.

Engine 
The motor's combustion process was optimized by changing the camshaft. This resulted in a significantly lower exhaust gas temperature, which is the basis for the performance increase.

Transmission 
One innovation is the ZF six-speed Sport-Switch-Tronic transmission. The switching time was reduced by 50% compared to the predecessor. The reaction time is 1/10 s. In manual mode, the driving feeling is similar to the shift dynamics of a dual clutch transmission.

Chassis 
A further feature is the EDC suspension tuning with the company Sachs Race Engineering.

Technical data

F10 B5 

Alpina produced two variants based on the BMW 5 Series (F10), the petrol-engined B5 and diesel-engined D5.

B5 Bi-Turbo 

The B5 is based on the 550i and is powered by an Alpina-modified version of the BMW N63 twin-turbo V8 engine. The transmission is an 8-speed automatic.

Alpina unveiled an updated B5 at the 2012 Geneva Motor Show. During 2015, Alpina sold the B5 Bi-Turbo Edition 50, which marked the company's 50th year in operation. The standard B5 received this same engine for the B5's last year of production, 2016.

D5 Bi-Turbo 
The D5 Bi-Turbo is based on the 535d.

7 Series based Alpinas

E38 B12 

Based on the BMW 750i and 750iL, Alpina released the B12 5.7 in 1995 and the B12 6.0 in 1999. According to Alpina the B12 5.7 was the world's first vehicle with an electrically heated metal catalyst as standard. The B12 5.7 has a 5.7 litre V12 and the B12 6.0 has a 6.0 litre V12.

E65 B7 

For the E65 7 Series generation, the Alpina B7 was widely credited with being able to hold its own against top performing offerings from Mercedes (including AMG) such as the S600 and S63 AMG, Audi (particularly quattro's Audi S8), the Bentley Flying Spur, and Jaguar XJ Supercharged, while BMW's own top-of-the-line V12 760Li was considered uncompetitive.

The E65 B7 uses a supercharged version of the 4.4-litre V8 found in the BMW 745i as the 750i and its 4.8-litre engine were not around when development began. The 760Li's naturally aspirated 6.0-litre V12 was deemed too heavy to have a sporty offshoot. The 2011 Alpina B7, with its twin-turbo 4.4-litre V8 engine and 6-speed automatic transmission, is less expensive and yet faster than its F01 stablemate, the 2010 BMW 760Li powered by a twin-turbo 6.0-litre V12 mated to an 8-speed automatic transmission. The B7's engine, derived from the BMW N63 that is found in the standard BMW lineup, matches the BMW 750i in fuel economy despite increased performance, plus its lighter weight than the 760Li's V12 engine gives the B7 considerably better weight distribution and handling than the 760Li.

BMW of North America, LLC offered 800 Alpina B7s as limited edition models for 2007 and 2008, all of which quickly sold out.

F01/F02 B7 

The F01 B7 will be offered again for the 2011 model year in the US, with approximately 500 vehicles (half of the annual production of the B7) with a choice of rear-wheel drive or all-wheel drive and/or a standard or long wheelbase (the B7, B7 L (long wheelbase), B7 xDrive (all-wheel drive), and B7 L xDrive), otherwise all configurations have the same equipment. Roughly 80 models will be sold in Canada, all of the xDrive variety due to that country's winter weather.

The B7's twin-turbo 4.4-litre V8 is assembled by hand at Alpina's facility in Buchloe, Germany, before being shipped to BMW for installation, and the assembled vehicle is then sent back to Alpina for finishing touches. It is based upon BMW's twin-turbo V8 but produces considerable more torque and horsepower, albeit with some turbo lag due to the larger turbos, yet more measured throttle mapping makes the B7 smoother than a stock BMW 750i.

While BMW uses run-flat tires for its 7 Series, the B7 comes with non-reinforced tires with a tire repair kit for emergencies. By using conventional, softer-sidewalled tires, compared to the reinforced sidewalls of run-flats, Alpina engineers were able to stiffen the B7's suspension for better handling and still improve the ride quality over that of a stock BMW 750i.

Compared to BMW M's version of the 4.4L twin-turbo engine (such as found in the F10 M5), Alpina's engine has  less but more maximum torque which is also available at a lower rpm.

In a comparison of the 2013 BMW 7 series and the Alpina B7, Motor Trend stated the B7 handled better than the BMW 760iL, but not as well as the 750iL.

G12 B7 

8 Series based Alpinas

E31 B12

B12 5.0

The B12 5.0 was built from 1990 to 1994 and is based on the BMW E31 850i. It is powered by an Alpina modified BMW M70 V12 (shared with the E32 B12 5.0) producing  and mated to an automatic transmission.

B12 5.7

The B12 5.7 was available from 1992 and is based on the 850CSi. It is powered by an increased displacement version of the BMW S70 V12 with a modified intake, crankshaft. camshafts and a stainless steel exhaust system as well as a six speed manual gearbox with an optional system called Shift-Tronic that automatically actuates the clutch when shifting and allows the vehicle to creep in traffic, 32 B12 5.7s were equipped with Shift-Tronic.
it produced . The carbon-fibre hood has cooling vents and a NACA duct.

G16 B8

B8 Gran Coupé

The Alpina B8 Gran Coupé was available in 2021 and is based on the BMW M850i and M8 Gran Coupé's respectively. Alpina tuned suspension and handling provided drivers with a Comfort+ and Sport+ mode for ideal ride comfort and performance. The exterior sports Alpina Classic 21 inch wheels featuring 20 spokes per wheel, Alpina designed front and rear bumpers, and a choice of Alpina blue or green metallic paint. The interior features Alpina trim appointments, custom Alpina leather upholstery, and or BMW Individual trims and upholstery.

Technical data

Alpina Roadster V8

With production of the BMW Z8 completed by November 2002, for 2003 the Z8 production was replaced by the Alpina Roadster V8. The Alpina was a departure from the hard-edged sporting focus of the original car, and elements of the new grand touring intent were evident throughout this final edition.

Instead of the original six-speed manual and 4.9 L (S62) engine featured in Z8's, the Alpina came only as an automatic, using a five-speed BMW Steptronic transmission mated to a 4.8 L Alpina-tuned V8 motor from the Alpina E39 B10 V8 S (Alpina F5). In order to complete the car's transition from sports car to Alpina, relaxed suspension tuning was used. The standard Z8's run-flat tires on  wheels were discarded in favor of conventional tires with softer sidewalls, on  wheels.

A new, softer grade of Nappa leather replaced the Z8's less supple specification, and special Alpina gauges were featured on the dash cluster. An Alpina steering wheel with three solid spokes replaced the original, which could not be retrofitted with shift paddles for the automatic. Gear selection was displayed in an Alpina-specific display mounted in front of the wheel.

Only 555 of these Alpinas were built, 450 of which were exported to the U.S. market and only eight to the UK. In the United States, this special edition of the Z8 was sold directly through BMW dealerships, marking a first for Alpina, whose cars had never been sold through retail channels in the U.S.

Gallery

See also
 ABT, similar marque specializing on high-performance Audi models.
 Brabus, similar marque specializing on high-performance Mercedes-Benz models.
 Lister, similar marque specializing on high-performance Jaguar models.

References

External links

 Official website
 Alpina-Archive
 Alpina Cars: Overview of all BMW–Alpina cars
 The online owner community for BMW Alpinas
 Information on Alpina typewriters

ADAC GT Masters teams
Auto parts suppliers of Germany
Auto tuning companies
Automotive motorsports and performance companies
BMW in motorsport
Car brands
Car manufacturers of Germany
Companies based in Bavaria
Luxury motor vehicle manufacturers
Sports car manufacturers
Vehicle manufacturing companies established in 1965
British Touring Car Championship teams
German racecar constructors
German auto racing teams
24 Hours of Le Mans teams